The Fred Schwengel Memorial Bridge is a 4-lane steel girder bridge that carries Interstate 80 across the Mississippi River between LeClaire, Iowa and Rapids City, Illinois. The bridge is named for Fred Schwengel, a former U.S. Representative from Davenport, Iowa and one of the driving forces behind the Interstate Highway Act. The structure was designed by the Iowa State Highway Commission, and was built by the Industrial Construction Company of Minneapolis (contractor), Gould Construction Company of Davenport, and Roy Ryan & Sons of Evanston, Indiana who was responsible for the substructure. The bridge opened on October 27, 1966, and is maintained by the Illinois Department of Transportation. It underwent a major rehabilitation project in 1996.

History
On October 5, 1964, a 40-foot steel and wood form was swinging from its roadstead on pier No. 13 after cement was being dumped on it. In 1965, structural steel was installed on the bridge. During that year, officials inspected the bridge. On June 29, 1966, the bridge's center span was installed. The bridge opened to traffic on October 27, 1966.

In 1995, the bridge was renamed for former U.S. Representative Fred Schwengel. He was among the attendees of the October 27, 1966 bridge opening.

Temporary closures
In 2008, the bridge was closed for two months after inspectors found cracks in the steel under the bridge deck. On May 12, 2009, the eastbound lane of the bridge closed after a crack was found in the top flange of the beam. As a result, inspectors visited the bridge and determined on how to repair the beam. The bridge reopened in August 2009. On April 10, 2015, the westbound lanes of the bridge closed for repairs on the joints and reopened on April 14, 2015.

Replacement
Starting in 2020, the Illinois Department of Transportation will begin a study, which is expected to cost $20,000, to replace the span. The plan from 2020 to 2025 is to spend $304.5 million on the bridge. By 2025, Illinois is expected to spend $23 billion on concrete, as well as fixing and expanding  of roadways and 9 million square feet (836,000 square meters) of bridge decks. The Illinois department will be the lead agency on the project with the state of Iowa sharing in the costs.

Bison Bridge
On March 18, 2021, a plan was announced by Chad Pregracke to repurpose the Fred Schwengel Memorial Bridge into a national park. The proposal gives an estimate that taxpayers would save 30 to 40 million dollars by foregoing the demolition of the bridge. The project would allow both bison and pedestrians to roam freely between Iowa and Illinois and also place a visitor center directly on the bridge.

See also
 
 
 
 
 List of crossings of the Upper Mississippi River

References

External links
 I-80 Fred Schwengel Memorial Bridge, Davenport, IA

Road bridges in Illinois
Road bridges in Iowa
Bridges over the Mississippi River
Interstate 80
Bridges completed in 1966
Bridges on the Interstate Highway System
Tourist attractions in the Quad Cities
Bridges in Rock Island County, Illinois
Bridges in Scott County, Iowa
Bridges in the Quad Cities
Monuments and memorials in Iowa
Monuments and memorials in Illinois
Steel bridges in the United States
Girder bridges in the United States
1966 establishments in Illinois
1966 establishments in Iowa
Interstate vehicle bridges in the United States